Emma Biss (born 31 May 1990) is an Australian cricketer who plays for Western Fury and Perth Scorchers as a medium pace bowler.

Born in Perth, Western Australia, and educated at Corpus Christi College, Perth, Biss represented WA at the 2006–07 National Under 19 Championships, and made her debut for the Fury in 2007–08.  The highlight of her debut season was her claiming of the final wicket in a famous WNCL victory over the New South Wales Breakers at Aquinas College.

Since then, Biss has been a regular opening bowler in the Fury side, and also a big-hitting lower-order batter.  In November 2013, she again starred for the Fury, with a five-wicket haul against Victorian Spirit.

Biss was named in the Scorchers squad for its inaugural WBBL01 season (2015–16), and achieved best figures of 2–14.  She remained in the Scorchers squad for the  WBBL02 season (2016–17).

References

External links

1990 births
Australian women cricketers
Cricketers from Western Australia
Living people
Perth Scorchers (WBBL) cricketers
Sportswomen from Western Australia
Western Australia women cricketers